Kaadhale Nimmadhi is a 1998 Indian Tamil-language romantic drama film directed by Indhran. The film stars Suriya, Murali, Jeevitha Sharma and Sangeetha. Raadhika, Manivannan and Nassar also play significant roles in the film, while Deva composed the film's soundtrack.

Plot
Kavitha, who is part of a large family, is to be married to Chandramohan, a lawyer. Kavita was playing with a little girl while Chandru is seen capturing photos of statues. Kavitha's brother (Nassar), who wrongly assumes both of them to be in love with each other, starts hitting Chandru. The whole family suspects Kavitha for falling in love and refuses to believe her explanation.

When Kavitha disappears from home, her family assumes Chandru of abducting her and gets him arrested. Chandramohan fights on behalf of Chandru with Kavitha revealing the actual reason. Chandramohan advises Kavitha's family to get her married to Chandru, to which they accept.

Cast

 Murali as Chandramohan
 Suriya as Chandru
 Jividha Sharma as Kavitha (Credited as Kavitha)
 Sangeetha
 Nassar as Kavitha's brother
 Manivannan as Velayudham
 Raadhika as Bhagyam
 Vivek as Panchu
 Ramji as Prabhu
 Thalaivasal Vijay as Singer
 Sathyan as Akash
 Thenkachi Ko. Swaminathan as Judge
 Vaiyapuri as Beggar
 Charuhasan
 Geetha
 Shanthi Williams
 Pandu
 V. Gowthaman as Servant
K. S. Jayalakshmi
 B. Lenin cameo appearance in song "Kandhan Irukkum"
Harikumar as a dancer in "Kaadhale Nimmathi"

Production
After the success of Kadhal Kottai (1996) and Kaalamellam Kadhal Vaazhga (1997), 'Sivashakthi' Pandian announced he was set to make another love story Kaadhale Nimmadhi, written and directed by Rajan, director of Solaikuyil (1989) and Malai Chaaral (1991). 'Sivashakthi' Pandian gave him the stage name of Indhran. Prashanth had initially been signed on to portray the lead role, though opted out post the success of Jeans (1998), and was replaced by Suriya. The débutante lead actress, Jeevitha Sharma, a fifteen-year-old at the time, was noticed by producer 'Sivashakthi' Pandian in his search for a new heroine for the film. The producer also opened a contest in Kumudam magazine to rename Jeevitha and give her a stage name to suit Tamil tastes and traditions. She was later christened as Kavitha by the producer before the film's release.

Soundtrack
Soundtrack was composed by Deva and lyrics written by Arivumathi, Palani Bharathi, Ponniyin Selvan and Deva.

Critical reception
A critic from Indolink.com gave the film a positive review suggesting that audiences should treat themselves to this movie, which is completely suitable for the entire family but Suriya again shows his inability to act and praised the performances of Manivannan, Vivek and Raadhika.

Box office
The film was a blockbuster
category at the box-office. Soon after the release of the film, director Indhran teamed up with Murali for a film titled Thamirabharani co-starring Rambha in a lead role. Despite progressing through production and changing the title to Thendralai Thoodhu Viddu, the film did not have a theatrical release.

References

External links
 

1998 films
1990s Tamil-language films
Indian drama films
Films scored by Deva (composer)
1998 drama films